Morten Rutkjær (born 17 March 1974) is a Danish former football player and currently manager of the Greenland national football team.

Rutkjær played professional football at B93 and represented the team in the Danish Superliga.

Career
Following his retirement he became a manager. In January 2012 he became new manager of Vanløse IF in the Danish 2nd Division. He resigned in the summer of 2013.

In January 2015 he became new manager of the reserve team of Holbæk B&I. He left this job half a year later, when he was appointed new manager of B93.

In December 2016 he left B93 by mutual consent. On 29 December 2016 it was announced that he would be new assistant manager to Danny Jung at Boldklubben Frem from January 2017. When Jung left the club in August 2017, Rutkjær followed him.

On 29 June 2019, Rutkjær was appointed assistant manager of B.93, which he earlier had been manager of. He left in December 2019 following the sacking of Danny Jung.

In August 2020 he was named new manager of the Greenland national football team.

References

External links
 BK Frem Profile
 DBU Profile

1974 births
Living people
Danish men's footballers
Danish football managers
Boldklubben af 1893 players
Boldklubben Frem players
Danish Superliga players
Boldklubben af 1893 managers
Association football defenders
People from Odsherred Municipality
Holbæk B&I players
Sportspeople from Region Zealand